The 2007 V8 Supercar season was the 48th year of touring car racing in Australia since the first runnings of the Australian Touring Car Championship and the fore-runner of the present day Bathurst 1000, the Armstrong 500.

There were 15 touring car race meetings held during 2007; a fourteen-round series for V8 Supercars, the 2007 V8 Supercar Championship Series (VCS), two of them endurance races and a seven-round second tier V8 Supercar series 2007 Fujitsu V8 Supercar Series (FVS), all bar one of those was a double-header with a V8 Supercar Championship Series round.

This season saw a change of television broadcaster; the Seven Network having picked up the broadcasting rights to V8 Supercars from Network Ten and Fox Sports which had broadcast the past nine seasons in succession. However, the Seven Network had lost the rights to V8 Supercars in 2014. Since 2015, Network Ten and Fox Sports had revived the brocasting rights for the V8 Supercars.

Results and standings

Race calendar
The 2007 Australian touring car season consisted of 21 events held over 15 meetings.

Fujitsu V8 Supercar Series

V8 Supercar Championship Series

References

Additional references can be found in linked event/series reports.

External links
 Official V8 Supercar site
 2007 Racing Results Archive 

 
Supercar seasons

pl:V8 Supercar Championship Series 2007
sv:V8 Supercar 2007